Der Arzt von Bothenow is an East German film directed by Johannes Knittel. It was released in 1961.

External links
 

1961 films
1961 drama films
German drama films
East German films
1960s German-language films
Medical-themed films
1960s German films